The Municipality of Two Borders is a rural municipality (RM) in the Canadian province of Manitoba.  It is located in the extreme south-west corner of the province in the Westman Region.   

The rural municipality's name is a reference to its location abutting Manitoba's western border with the province of Saskatchewan and Manitoba's southern international border with the American state of North Dakota. The Town of Melita is located within the municipality, but is a separate urban municipality.

History

The municipality was created on January 1, 2015 via the amalgamation of the RMs of Albert, Arthur and Edward. It was formed as a requirement of The Municipal Amalgamations Act, which required that municipalities with a population less than 1,000 amalgamate with one or more neighbouring municipalities by 2015. The Government of Manitoba initiated these amalgamations in order for municipalities to meet the 1997 minimum population requirement of 1,000 to incorporate a municipality.  The amalgamation did not include the Town of Melita, which is surrounded by Two Borders.

Concrete Beam Bridge
In the municipality, an historic bridge, Concrete Beam Bridge No. 1351, crosses Graham Creek about three kilometres west of Melita. It was constructed in 1927 by John Kenward and Company for $6,443 and is on the Canadian Register of Historic Places.

Communities
Bede
Bernice
Broomhill
Elva
Lyleton
Pierson
Tilston

Demographics 

See also
Antler–Lyleton Border Crossing
Westhope–Coulter Border Crossing
List of historic places in Westman Region, Manitoba

References

2015 establishments in Manitoba
Borders of Manitoba
Manitoba municipal amalgamations, 2015
Populated places established in 2015
Rural municipalities in Manitoba